Herman Brock Jr. (born September 18, 1970) is a left-handed Dutch bluegrass, Americana and Blues musician, multi-instrumentalist and singer-songwriter. He is also author of the series 'Secrets of the guitar'.

Biography
Herman was born in Winterswijk, and grew up in Terneuzen in the Netherlands. He played guitar with his father Herman Brock Sr's FFFF-band as a teenager.
His main instruments are vocals and guitar, but also plays banjo, mandolin, autoharp and dulcimer.

Bands
In 1999 Brock formed the Eurocasters band with bassplayer Lizz Sprangers.

In 2003 the cd 'Straight Up!' was recorded in Palmer, Texas with contributions from a.o. Mike Morgan, Hash Brown en Holland K. Smith.

Brock's last Eurocasters' album ‘Coco Loco’ was recorded in 2005 in Austin, TX. Produced by Jesse Dayton, with a.o. Erik Hokkanen and Redd Volkaert. Jesse in turn recorded two songs by Herman on his album 'South Austin Sessions'.

In 2006 Brock formed his bluegrass and old-time trio Brock & The Brockettes with Lizz Sprangers and Geertje van den Berg.

Since 2009 he also plays with his Bluegrass band "Brock's Blue Grass Bunch".

Discography

Own bands 
2019: Herman Brock Jr. – Freedom – single 
2016: Herman Brock Jr. – Lust for life / Live your life to the limit – single 
2015: Herman Brock Jr. – The Old World 
2009: Brock's Blue Grass Bunch – Brock's Blue Grass Bunch 
2007: Brock & The Brockettes – Gather around the mic – ASIN: B0011V9R7E
2005: Herman Brock Jr. & The Eurocasters – Coco Loco
2003: Herman Brock Jr. & The Eurocasters – Straight Up! – ASIN: B000FTKRDG
2002: Herman Brock Jr. & The Eurocasters – The Devil's Got A Hold On Me
1999: Herman Brock Jr. & The Eurocasters – Demo 1999

As guest musician 
2005: Jesse Dayton – South Austin Sessions
1993: Brock Family – Land Of Jubilee
1991: Herman Brock & The FFFF – State 51

Bibliography 
Secrets of the guitar – series:
How to use the CAGED guitar chords system – ASIN: B00A7L7D8O
How to read tabs and tablature – ASIN: B00796EYRI
How to play basic open guitar chords for beginners – ASIN: B00BKQR920
How to play the blues guitar scale in E [minor] – ASIN: B007JWPT26
How to play the E minor pentatonic scale – ASIN: B007BBYKOI
How to play the G major pentatonic scale – ASIN: B007ZVGSOO
How to play the aeolian or natural minor scale in A – ASIN: B007S94IEA
How to play Do-Re-Mi, the Ionian or major Scale in C – ASIN: B009YK1MIQ
How to play mixolydian or southern rock scale in G – ASIN: B00AY79J6U

References

External links
Official website
Brock & The Brockettes
Brock's Blue Grass Bunch

1970 births
Living people
Dutch bluegrass musicians
Dutch male guitarists
Dutch singer-songwriters
People from Winterswijk
21st-century Dutch male singers
21st-century Dutch singers
21st-century guitarists